Events in the year 1945 in Brazil.(Incumbents, Events, Arts and culture, Births, Deaths)

Incumbents

Federal government
President: Getúlio Vargas (until 29 October); José Linhares (from 29 October)

Governors 
 Alagoas: 
 till 10 November: Ismar de Góis Monteiro  
 10 November-18 December: Edgar de Góis Monteiro 
 from 18 December: Antonio Guedes de Miranda
 Amazonas: Álvaro Botelho Maia (till 7 November); Emiliano Estanislau Afonso (from 7 November)
 Bahia: Renato Onofre Pinto Aleixo then João Vicente Bulcão Viana
 Ceará: Francisco de Meneses Pimentel (till 28 October); Benedito Augusto Carvalho dos Santos (from 28 October)
 Espírito Santo: Jones dos Santos Neves (till 27 October); José Rodrigues Sette (from 27 October)
 Goiás: Pedro Ludovico Teixeira (till 6 November); Eládio de Amorim (from 6 November)
 Maranhão: 
 Mato Grosso: Júlio Strübing Müller then Olegário de Barros
 Minas Gerais: Benedito Valadares Ribeiro (till 4 November); Nísio Batista de Oliveira (from 4 November)
 Pará: 
 till 29 October: Magalhães Barata
 29 October-30 October: João Guilherme Bittencourt 
 30 October-6 November: Zacarias de Assumpção 
 from 6 November: Manuel Maroja Neto
 Paraíba: 
 till 15 July: Rui Carneiro
 15 July-6 November: Samuel Duarte
 from 6 November: Severino Montenegro
 Paraná: Manuel Ribas
 Pernambuco: Agamenon Magalhães
 Piauí: 
 till 9 November: Leônidas Melo
 6 November-19 December: Antônio Leôncio Pereira Ferraz
 from 19 December: Benedito Martins Napoleão do Rego
 Rio Grande do Norte: Rafael Fernandes Gurjão/Antonio Fernandes Dantas
 Rio Grande do Sul: Ernesto Dornelles (till 6 November); Samuel Figueiredo da Silva (from 6 November)
 Santa Catarina: Nereu Ramos (till 6 November); Luís Gallotti (from 6 November)
 São Paulo: 
 till 27 October: Fernando de Sousa Costa 
 27 October-7 November: Sebastião Nogueira de Lima
 from 7 November: José Carlos de Macedo Soares
 Sergipe: 
 till 27 October: Augusto Maynard Gomes
 27 October-5 November: Francisco Leite Neto
 from 5 November: Hunald Santaflor Cardoso

Vice governors 
 Rio Grande do Norte:
 São Paulo:

Events

February - A fourth transport of troops of the Brazilian Expeditionary Force reaches Italy, in preparation for the Spring 1945 offensive.
2 May - Brazilian troops arrive in Turin on the same day that the cessation of hostilities is announced.
May - Bishop Carlos Duarte Costa, an outspoken critic of the regime of President Getúlio Vargas and of the Vatican's alleged relationship with fascist regimes, gives newspaper interviews accusing Brazil's Papal nuncio of Nazi-Fascist spying, and accusing Rome of having aided and abetted Hitler. Shortly afterwards he establishes the Brazilian Catholic Apostolic Church.
29 October - President Vargas resigns, beginning the period known as the Second Brazilian Republic.  José Linhares becomes acting president.
2 December - A general election is held, the first since the establishment of Getúlio Vargas' Estado Novo.   The presidential election is won by Eurico Gaspar Dutra of the Social Democratic Party (PSD), which also wins a majority of seats in both the Chamber of Deputies and the Senate.

Arts and culture

Books
Oswald de Andrade - A Arcádia e a Inconfidência

Films
O Cortiço
O Gol da Vitória
Não Adianta Chorar

Births
11 January - Geraldo Azevedo, singer and guitarist
18 February - Edir Macedo, evangelical leader and media mogul
7 May - Zila Bezerra, teacher and politician
13 August - Vânia Dantas Leite, pianist, conductor, music educator and composer (died 2018)
26 September - Gal Costa, singer 
8 October - Paulo Thiago, film director and screenwriter (died 2021)
27 October - Luiz Inácio Lula da Silva, 35th President of Brazil
Unknown date - Eduardo Escorel, film editor and director

Deaths
25 February - Mário de Andrade,  poet, novelist, musicologist, art historian and critic, and photographer (born 1893; heart attack)
12 April - Max Wolff Filho, war hero (born 1912; killed in action)

See also
 1945 in Brazilian football

References

See also 
1945 in Brazilian football
List of Brazilian films of 1945

 
1940s in Brazil
Years of the 20th century in Brazil
Brazil
Brazil